France Dhélia (born Franceline Berthe Léontine Délia Benoît; November 9, 1894 – May 6, 1964) was a French film actress. Dhélia appeared in more than forty films, mostly in the silent era. Many of her appearances were in the films of the director Gaston Roudès.

Selected filmography
 House in the Sun (1929)
 Roger la Honte (1933)

References

Bibliography
Oscherwitz, Dayna & Higgins, Maryellen. The A to Z of French Cinema. Scarecrow Press, 2009.

External links

1894 births
1964 deaths
French film actresses
French silent film actresses
20th-century French actresses